The Ontario Games program is Ontario, Canada's largest multi-sport amateur event which involves hosting and organizing separate events for athletes aged 9–18 years, parasport athletes, and athletes 55 and older. The program is provided by the Government of Ontario's Ministry of Heritage, Sport, Tourism and Culture Industries. Games Ontario is the provincial crown corporation charged with organizing this multi-sport event under the title of "Ontario Games".

Beginning in 1970, the event acted as a showcase for amateur sport. Today the objectives of the event are also meant to provide developmental and competitive opportunities for Ontario's amateur athletes in order to help them prepare for future national and international competitions and help older adults remain active. The Ontario Games are the only multi-sport event of this calibre hosted in the province.

Events include: the Ontario Summer Games (OSG), the Ontario Winter Games (OWG), the Ontario 55+ Summer Games, the Ontario 55+ Winter Games, and the Ontario Parasport Games (OPG).

The most recent Ontario Summer Games (OSG) took place in 2022 in the City of Mississauga. The 2020 games which were previously postponed to 2021 were cancelled due to the COVID-19 pandemic.

The most recent Ontario Winter Games (OWG) were initially scheduled to take place from February 25–27 and March 3–6, 2022 in Renfrew County, Ontario, but were postponed due to Covid-19.

The Ontario ParaSport Games (OPG) took place in 2022 from May 13 to 15 in the City of Mississauga. The games were originally scheduled for 2021 but were postponed to 2022 due to the COVID-19 pandemic.

History of the Ontario Games

The Ontario Games began as a multi-sport event in Ontario, Canada in 1970 and the event acted as a showcase for amateur sport. Today it is also designed to aid in the development of high performance amateur athletes and prepare them for both the national and international level of sports competition.

Sports

Summer sports

There are more than 15 different sporting events included in the Ontario Summer Games. This includes: basketball, canoe kayak, field hockey, lacrosse (box and field), rugby, softball, table tennis and volleyball (indoor and beach).

Winter sports

The Ontario Winter Games is delivered by the Sport Alliance of Ontario. A total of 18 sports are included in the program:

 
 
 
 
 
 
 
 
 

 
 
 
 
 
 
   Synchronized Swimming

Parasports

The ParaSport games of Ontario are administered by ParaSport Ontario and currently includes the following 35 parasports:

Alpine Skiing
Amputee Hockey
Archery
Athletics
Baseball
 Boccia
Canoe / Kayak
Circus Arts
Cycling
Dance
Dragon Boat Racing
Equestrian

Fishing
 Goalball
Golf
Ice Skating
Martial Arts
Nordic Skiing
Powerchair Hockey
Powerlifting
Rowing
Running
Sailing
Sitting Volleyball

 Sledge Hockey Para ice hockey or sled hockey
Soccer
Swimming
Table Tennis
Waterskiing / Wakeboarding
 Wheelchair Basketball
Wheelchair Curling
Wheelchair Fencing
Wheelchair Rugby
Wheelchair Tennis
Yoga

55+ Summer sports

55+ Winter sports

The Ontario 55+ Winter Games was were created to support and assist in the development of Ontario's active older adults in 10 different sports. As of 2017 there were ten main areas of competition with each area further broken down into specific competitive events. Sports include:

 Alpine Skiing - ages 55+, 65+, 75+
 Badminton - ages 55+, 65+
 Curling
 Duplicate Bridge
 Ice Hockey - ages 55+, 65+

 Nordic Skiing - ages 55+
 Skating - ages 55+, 75+
 Table Tennis - ages 55+, 65+
 Ten Pin Bowling - ages 55+
 Volleyball - ages 55+, 65+

Ontario Summer Games

2020 Ontario Summer Games

London, Ontario had been chosen to host the 2020 Ontario Summer Games (OSG), but due to the COVID-19 pandemic, the event was cancelled. The plan had been to postpone the 2020 OSG until 2021 but again, due to the COVID-19 pandemic, they were cancelled and then scrapped altogether.

2021 Ontario Summer Games

The 2021 Ontario Summer Games were scheduled to be hosted as a result of the previous cancellation of the 2020 Ontario Summer Games due to the COVID-19 pandemic, but again, due to the COVID-19 pandemic, they were cancelled and then scrapped altogether.

2022 Ontario Summer Games

The Ontario Summer Games (OSG) took place in 2022 from July 21 to 24 in Mississauga with more than 3,500 athletes.

2024 Ontario Summer Games

The 2024 Ontario Summer Games (OSG) are scheduled to be held in London, Ontario.

Ontario Winter Games

2022 Ontario Winter Games

The 2022 Ontario Winter Games  (OWG) were given the go ahead after a lot of consideration due to the COVID-19 pandemic. The games were to be hosted by Renfrew County and were scheduled to be from February 25–27, 2022 and March 3–6, 2022 but were postponed due to covid-19.

27 sports will be a part of the 2022 OWG program. An estimated 3,500 athletes, coaches, officials and dignitaries are expected to attend.

Ontario ParaSport Games
The ParaSport games of Ontario are administered by ParaSport Ontario.

2021 Ontario ParaSport Games

The 2021 Ontario ParaSport Games (OPG) were postponed to 2022 due to the COVID-19 pandemic.

2022 Ontario ParaSport Games

The City of Mississauga hosted the 2022 Ontario ParaSport Games (OPG) after the games, originally scheduled for 2021, were postponed to 2022 due to the COVID-19 pandemic. The Ontario ParaSport Games ran from May 13 to 15, 2022.

Ontario 55+ Summer Games

Ontario 55+ Winter Games

2020 Ontario 55+ Winter Games

The COVID-19 pandemic forced the 2020 Ontario 55+ Winter Games to be cancelled.

See also
Canada Games
Canada Summer Games
Canada Winter Games
Western Canada Summer Games
BC Games
BC Summer Games
BC Winter Games
Alberta Winter Games
Saskatchewan Games
Manitoba Games
Quebec Games

References

Companies based in Toronto
Crown corporations of Ontario
Sports governing bodies in Ontario
Multi-sport events in Canada